Qeshlaq-e Hasan Kangarlu (also Romanized as Qeshlāq-e Ḩasan Kangarlū; also known as Ḩasan Qeshlāqī-ye Kangarlū) is a village in Garamduz Rural District, Garamduz District, Khoda Afarin County, East Azerbaijan Province, Iran. At the 2006 census, its population was 215, in 45 families.

References 

Populated places in Khoda Afarin County